The Mayor of the City of Richmond, Virginia is head of the executive branch of Richmond, Virginia's city government. The mayor's office administers all city services, public property, police and fire protection, most public agencies, and enforces all city, state and federal laws within Richmond, Virginia.

The mayor looks over a city budget at roughly $765 million a year.

Current mayor 
The current mayor is Democrat Levar Stoney, who was elected on November 8, 2016. Stoney took office on December 31, 2016.

Cabinet 
The mayor of Richmond contains a multi-member cabinet of advisers that assist the mayor on city policy decisions. The following individuals are part of Stoney's cabinet.

History of the office 

In May 1782, Virginia General Assembly expressed desire to move inland, to a place less exposed to British incursions than Williamsburg. Richmond had been made the temporary capital after urging from Thomas Jefferson years earlier, and it was soon decided to make the move permanent. 

Two months later, on July 2, a charter was written up, and the city was incorporated. Twelve men were to be elected from the City at-large and were to select one of their own to act as Mayor, another to serve as Recorder and four to serve as Aldermen. The remaining six were to serve as members of the Common Council. All positions had term limits of three years, with the exception of the mayor who could only serve one year consecutively. A vote was held at a meeting the following day, and Dr. William Foushee, Sr. was chosen as the first mayor.

In March 1851, the decision was made to replace the original Richmond City Charter. It was decided that all city officials were to be popularly elected. After the 12-year tenure of William Lambert and his short-term replacement by recorder Samuel C. Pulliam, elections were held, with Joseph C. Mayo coming out on top.

Mayo was deposed in April 1865, weeks before the end of the American Civil War, when Union forces captured the city.

The system set forth by the Second City Charter worked as long as the City was small and most voters knew personally, the qualifications of the men for whom they were voting and the requirements for the jobs to which they were elected.

Beginning in 1948, Richmond eliminated the popularly elected mayor's office, and instituted a council-manager form of government. This lasted until 2004, when the City Charter was changed once again, bringing back the popularly elected mayor. Former Virginia Gov. L. Douglas Wilder was elected mayor that year. Of Virginia's 38 cities, only Richmond does not have a council-manager form of government.

Offices appointed 

The mayor has the power to appoint the directors and administrative leaders of the following city offices and departments:

 Chief Administrative Officer
 Department of Economic and Community Development
 Department of Finance
 Department of Public Works
 Department of Human Resources
 Department of Human Services
 Department of Information Technology
 Department of Justice Services
 Departments of Parks, Recreation and Community Facilities
 Department of Planning and Zoning Review
 Department of Procurement Services
 Department of Public Utilities
 Department of Public Works
 Department of Social Services
 Office of Budget and Strategic Planning
 Office of Minority Business Development
 Office of the Chief Administrative Officer
 Office of the Mayor
 Office of the Press Secretary
 Richmond Fire Department
 Richmond Police Department
 Richmond Public Library
 Richmond Public Schools

See also 
Government of Richmond, Virginia

References

External links 
Official Website